Charles Goeller (1901–1955) was an American artist best known for precise and detailed paintings and drawings in which, he once said, he aimed to achieve "emotion expressed by precision." Employing, as one critic wrote, an "exquisitely meticulous realism," he might take a full year to complete work on a single picture. Early in his career he achieved critical recognition for his still lifes, in which one critic saw an "acumen of genius" working to produce "truly superb achievement of team work between eyes that see and hands that do." Later, he also became known for cityscapes in which he employed precisionist flat planes and geometric forms to show the physical structures of his subjects.

Art training

Goeller's father and grandfather were structural engineers who ran a successful iron and steel fabricating plant in Newark, New Jersey. Upon graduating from high school Goeller studied mathematics, civil engineering, and architecture first at Rensselaer Polytechnic Institute and later at Cornell University. Afterwards his grandfather agreed to support five years of art and architecture study in France. Beginning in 1923 he received art instruction from Jean Despujols and other members of the faculty at the École Américaine de Fontainebleau. During this period Goeller also studied at Académie de la Grande Chaumière, a small left-bank atelier in Paris.

Art career, 1930s

After his return to the United States Goeller joined the young American artists associated with the Daniel Gallery located on Madison Avenue in New York. In March 1929 the gallery included his work in an exhibition that also included paintings by Peter Blume, Preston Dickinson, Elsie Driggs, Karl Knaths, and Yasuo Kuniyoshi. Reviewing the show, critics called attention to a still life of his called "Checkered Tablecloth."  One remarked on the high quality of the work and pointed out that the cloth "drapes itself cunningly," another noted his "meticulous technique" and "vibrating color," and a third saw in it a tendency toward Neues Sachlichkeit.

The following year the same still life appeared in a group exhibit at the Museum of Modern Art. Called "Forty-six Painters and Sculptors Under Thirty-One Years of Age," it contained an international mix of art by younger artists, including many whose careers would later flourish. One critic for the New York Times, Elisabeth Luther Cary, praised the painting as "a truly superb achievement of team work between eyes that see and hands that do" and another Times critic, Edward Alden Jewell, said his still life, with its "fabric wizardry," was attracting much attention. The same year Jewell commented on "Blue Brocade," a still life of Goeller's included in a group show at the Daniel Gallery. Calling it "sumptuous" and "ravishing," he said its virtuosity made it comparable to the work of early-Renaissance goldsmiths and concluded: "Here, once more, in this expert solution of a painter's problem, the centuries become but as a day."

In a paper read at the College Art Association meeting in 1931 Alfred H. Barr cited Goeller as one of a group of young Americans whom he called "New Objectivists." A year later Goeller exhibited work in a show called "American Scenes and Subjects" put on by the College Art Association at the Rehn Gallery. Reviewing a group exhibition at the Daniel Gallery in 1931, a critic referred to Goeller and the show's other artists as practitioners of "pure painting." By this he meant the group focused the experience of the observer. He said the artists aimed to draw the viewer's attention to "what lies beyond or beneath or above." Another reviewer of that show said one of Goeller's paintings in the exhibition was "a good illustration of the modern use of color as an integral part of the expression form." In 1933 Goeller showed still lifes, figure studies, and landscapes in a solo exhibition at Argent Gallery. In reviewing the show, Howard Devree of the New York Times said Goeller had made a "very commendable achievement." He praised the still lifes for his outstanding use of color and the remarkable fabric textures he was able to achieve, but felt the figure studies were not maturely realized and the landscapes overly flat.

Having achieved critical recognition for his still lifes in the early 1930s, Goeller painted a larger number of landscapes during the middle and late years of the decade. After joining the Public Works of Art Project, he painted the highly regarded "Third Avenue" in 1934. In a style that was identified as precisionist, this painting used geometric forms and flat planes to emphasize "the scale and power of modern technology," according to a biographer, Following his employment in the Public Works of Art Project, Goeller joined the Federal Art Project. Subsequently, a mural of his won a cash prize in a 1935 competition and was exhibited at the Architectural League.

Art career, 1940s–1950s

During the 1940s Goeller was represented by the Bonestell Gallery. In reviewing the first of his shows with that gallery Howard Devree noted a wide range in style, "from almost stereoscopic realism to a misty impression of New Jersey meadows and veritable silver point drawings of great delicacy and technical perfection." In reviewing the second he added that Goeller found "reluctant beauty" in the landscapes and was able to obtain a "strange mood."

Sometime before 1943 Goeller drew a trompe l'oeil self-portrait entitled "How Does It Feel to be a Piece of Paper?" The drawing makes it seem as if the viewer's eye is the paper on which the artist's pencil is descending.  He showed it in the Society of Independent Artists annual exhibition of 1943, at the Bonestell Gallery in 1945, and in museum exhibitions in 1943, 1949, and 1953. In 1941 and 1942 he showed with a group called Modern Artists of New Jersey. In 1943 Goeller joined the Associated Artists of New Jersey and showed with them at the Riverside Museum in 1943, 1944, 1947, and 1950.

In 1952, not long before his untimely death, a landscape of Goeller's appeared in the Whitney Museum annual exhibition of contemporary painting. In reviewing the show Howard Devree listed it along with others that he deemed to be outstanding, describing it as a "moody monochromatic interpretation of the Jersey meadows."

At the outset of his artistic career Goeller said he aimed to achieve coherence in his work and a freedom from exaggeration. He said he wished to avoid "sacrifices to obtain an effect." At the end of his career his work was noted as evoking a pervasive mood of "wistful loneliness" and possessing a "haunting, disquieting aspect" which bore out his belief in "emotion expressed by precision."

Art teacher

Goeller, who has been called a "passionate advocate for art education," was an art instructor in the College of Architecture at Cornell University between 1931 and 1933 and an instructor in the Newark School of Fine and Industrial Arts in the early 1950s.

Personal life

Goeller was born in Irvington, New Jersey, on November 10, 1901. His father, Charles Goeller was born 1876 in Germany and brought to the United States by his parents in 1879. Apart from the few years in Irvington between 1900 and 1910, he lived most of his life in Newark. He was living in nearby Elizabeth when he died in 1961, having outlived his son Charles by six years. In 1884 Goeller's paternal grandfather, Frederick Goeller, founded the Goeller Iron Works in Newark, specializing in ornamental structures. By 1917 Goeller's father had assumed control of the business and renamed it the Charles Goeller Steel Co.
In 1942, he again reorganized it, this time as Charles Goeller, Inc., contractors in structural iron and steel. Goeller's mother was Hulda Weiss Goeller, born in 1878, who emigrated to the United States with her parents and seven siblings in 1883. He had an older brother, Leopold, born in Newark in 1899, and a younger sister, Hulda, born in Newark in 1907.

Goeller lived at his parents' Newark home through the 1920s, he shared an apartment in New York in the 1930s, and returned to his parents' home in the early 1940s. He lived in and around northern New Jersey during the remainder of his life.

He moved from New York to New Jersey in 1939 to work in his father's iron and steel factory. During World War II he was employed in the graphic art department of Fleetwings, a firm that made airplanes and aircraft components, located in Bristol, Pennsylvania. In addition to preparing technical drawings Goeller wrote a cartoon for the firm's bi-weekly tabloid newspaper, Fleetwing News. The cartoon featured a female character, Evangeline, who represented the contributions that young women were making to homefront production work. Goeller's wartime contribution also included evening classes he taught at Drexel Institute to help prepare for young people for factory work. He died at his home in Elizabeth, New Jersey, on March 6, 1955.

Other names

Goeller's full name was Charles Louis Goeller. He signed his works either Goeller or Charles L. Goeller.

Notes

References

1901 births
1955 deaths
20th-century American painters
American male painters
Modern painters
Cornell University College of Architecture, Art, and Planning alumni
Cornell University faculty
Artists from Elizabeth, New Jersey
People from Irvington, New Jersey
20th-century American male artists